Acetaldehyde ammonia trimer is a chemical compound described by the formula (CH3CHNH)3.  The pure material is colourless but samples often appear light yellow or slightly beige due to the degradation by oxidation. It is hygroscopic, and can be found in a trihydrate form.

As implied by its name, it is a trimeric species formed from the reaction of acetaldehyde and ammonia:
 3 CH3CHO  +  3  NH3  →  (CH3CHNH)3  +  3  H2O

Studies using NMR spectroscopy indicate that the three methyl groups are equatorial, thus the molecule has C3v point group symmetry.

The compound is related to hexamethylenetetramine, which is the condensation product of ammonia and formaldehyde.

References

External links
Material safety data sheet

Nitrogen heterocycles
Six-membered rings